Nazrul Islam Manju is a Bangladesh Nationalist Party politician and the former Member of Parliament of Khulna-2.

Career
He was elected to parliament from Khulna-2 as a Bangladesh Nationalist Party candidate in 2001. He was the General Secretary of the Khulna District unit of the party. He was expelled from Bangladesh Nationalist Party in 2008 for trying to reform the party.

References

Awami League politicians
Living people
9th Jatiya Sangsad members
Year of birth missing (living people)